The Union for Progress and Renewal (UPR) is an opposition political party in Guinea, founded in September 1998 through the merger of Siradio Diallo's Renewal and Progress Party and Ba Mamadou's Union for the New Republic. In the parliamentary election held on 30 June 2002, the party won 26.63% of the popular vote and 20 out of 114 seats. A section of the party boycotted the 2002 election, and it later joined the Union of Democratic Forces of Guinea.

The UPR is led by Bah Ousmane. It joined the government of Prime Minister Ahmed Tidiane Souaré, which was formed on June 19, 2008, receiving one post, that of Minister of Livestock and Animal Protection.

References

Political parties in Guinea